Homart Development Company, a Chicago-based subsidiary of Sears, was one of the largest builders of shopping centers and malls in the United States from 1959 to 1995.

Company history
As retail development in the United States shifted away from downtowns with the growth of suburbia after World War II, some major department stores such as Sears moved into the business of developing malls in which to place new anchor tenant locations.  Homart Development Company was founded in 1959 for the purpose of building regional shopping malls for Sears.  The "Homart" brand name had been used by Sears for many years before the development company was founded.

Seminary South Shopping Center in Fort Worth was their first project.

By 1971, Homart was operating nine regional shopping locations, and had numerous others in development. By 1994, it was also operating 36 of those developed malls.

In November 1994, Sears announced that it planned to sell off Homart as part of a restructuring.  General Growth Properties completed an acquisition of Homart in late 1995 in a transaction valued at $1.85 billion, then one of the biggest real estate deals in history.  Homart also owned a number of office buildings which were also sold in 1995.

Management
Sears executive Emory Williams was the first president of Homart. Warren G. Skoning was appointed president in 1967, and elected as chairman in 1974.  Also serving as vice-president of real estate development for Sears, Skoning was involved in the development of the Sears Tower.  W.E. Lewis was named president in 1974 when Skoning became chair.

Edwin Homer, former president of Chrysler Realty, joined as president in 1980, later became chair and CEO, and served until his retirement in 1984.  Homer diversified Homart's portfolio by developing office properties and community centers, in addition to malls, and also sold some of Homart's malls to generate additional profit for Sears.

In 1985, Michael J. Gregoire was named president and COO, and he also became chairman in 1987.

Notable projects 
Notable shopping centers developed by Homart include:

References

Shopping center management firms
Sears Holdings